Frédéric Covili (born 14 November 1975) is a French former alpine skier who competed in the 2002 Winter Olympics.

External links
 

1975 births
Living people
French male alpine skiers
Olympic alpine skiers of France
Alpine skiers at the 2002 Winter Olympics
FIS Alpine Ski World Cup champions